Ross is a small town located in the Westland District on the West Coast of New Zealand's South Island,  south-west of Hokitika and  north-east of Hari Hari by road.

History

Ross was established in the 1860s, during the West Coast Gold Rush, and became an important centre for miners. At its largest, the town had around 2,500 inhabitants, but the population declined after local goldfields were depleted in the early 1870s. Quartz was occasionally mined on Mount Greenland, a nearby ridge, but little more gold was found until two miners discovered a large 3.1-kilogram nugget in 1909, which was later named the "Honourable Roddy Nugget", after Roderick McKenzie, the Minister for Mines at the time.

From 1872 to the early 1900s a number of Chinese lived and worked in Ross, and a Chinese Miners' Memorial Garden on the shore of Ross Lake commemorates them.

The settlement was originally called Jones Flat, but was also sometimes known as Georgetown and Totara. It was given the name Rosstown, which was shortened to Ross in about 1866, after George Ross, who was the Canterbury Provincial Council's treasurer at the time of the naming.

Local government
Following the abolition of Westland Province in 1876, Ross became part of Westland County. In 1878, Ross Borough was formed, with its own borough council and mayor, and remained in existence until 1972, when it merged back into Westland County. Since the local government reforms of 1989, Ross has been part of Westland District.

Demographics

The Ross settlement had a usual resident population of 285 at the 2018 New Zealand census, a decrease of 12 people (−4.0%) since the 2013 census, and a decrease of 6 people (−2.1%) since the 2006 census.

Waitaha statistical area 
The Waitaha statistical area had a population of 450 at the 2018 New Zealand census, a decrease of 21 people (−4.5%) since the 2013 census, and an increase of 12 people (2.7%) since the 2006 census. There were 213 households. There were 246 males and 204 females, giving a sex ratio of 1.21 males per female. The median age was 51.7 years (compared with 37.4 years nationally), with 72 people (16.0%) aged under 15 years, 51 (11.3%) aged 15 to 29, 231 (51.3%) aged 30 to 64, and 99 (22.0%) aged 65 or older.

Ethnicities were 90.7% European/Pākehā, 14.7% Māori, 0.7% Pacific peoples, 2.0% Asian, and 4.0% other ethnicities (totals add to more than 100% since people could identify with multiple ethnicities).

The proportion of people born overseas was 10.0%, compared with 27.1% nationally.

Although some people objected to giving their religion, 58.7% had no religion, 30.7% were Christian and 3.3% had other religions.

Of those at least 15 years old, 39 (10.3%) people had a bachelor or higher degree, and 129 (34.1%) people had no formal qualifications. The median income was $24,300, compared with $31,800 nationally. The employment status of those at least 15 was that 195 (51.6%) people were employed full-time, 75 (19.8%) were part-time, and 12 (3.2%) were unemployed.

Economy

The town's economy is based around farming and forestry; a large open-cut mine operated directly adjacent to the town since 1988, and the large pit it created was filled with water in the 2000s to create Ross Lake.

Amenities and attractions 
Amenities in Ross include a dairy/convenience store with a New Zealand Post agency and a small self-service petrol station, a volunteer fire brigade and a police station.

Beside Ross Lake is the Chinese Miners' Memorial Garden, created over a two-year period by the Ross volunteer group Westland Regional Environment Incorporated Society (WRENIS) led by Biddy Manera, at a cost of $180,000. It includes a Chinese pavilion (liang ting) and ornamental tree planting. In winter 2020 a slip in Jones Creek blocked the outlet of the lake, and the pavilion was flooded and thousands of dollars worth of trees and shrubs were killed. Fully repairing the lake outlet would require a resource consent, so in the meantime WRENIS volunteers dug a small channel by hand to divert some of the flow of Jones Creek to a culvert, allowing lake levels to stabilise; work done by hand did not require a consent. Their work was repeatedly vandalised, however, for months and on an almost daily basis, causing the lake to rise and drown the gardens again. The Westland Regional Council, which manages waterways, was called in to support WRENIS's efforts. After two rounds of public consultation involving the Department of Conservation, the Westland District Council, and the Ross Community society, all parties agreed in March 2021 to lower the lake levels and prevent future flooding, with the District Council covering the cost of the resource consent.

Transport and infrastructure 
State Highway 6 passes through the town, connecting it in the north to Hokitika and south to Hari Hari and Franz Josef.

Intercity Coaches provides a bus service tor Ross with daily services to both Fox Glacier and Greymouth.

Ross is at the southern end of the West Coast Wilderness Trail, a cycle route with its northern end at Greymouth.

A branch line railway known as the Ross Branch was extended from Ruatapu to Ross on 1 April 1909, serving as the southern terminus of the line owned by the New Zealand Railways Department. However, a lengthy privately owned bush tramway ran south from the railway station to serve logging interests near Lake Ianthe and a railway extension from Ross through the Haast Pass to connect with the Otago Central Railway was proposed in the early 20th century, but did not eventuate. From the 1940s until 9 October 1962, a Vulcan railcar service operated directly from Christchurch to Ross twice a day. A lack of traffic and expensive maintenance costs meant the line was closed beyond Hokitika on 24 November 1980. Much of the old track bed between Ruatapu and Hokitika can be driven as it serves as an access road for local farmers, and a disused truss bridge still stands north of Ross.

Education

Ross School is the sole school in the town. It is a coeducational contributing (year 1–6) primary school with a roll of  students as of  The school opened in 1875 and celebrated its 125th anniversary in 2000.

The nearest intermediate and secondary school (year 7–13) is Westland High School in Hokitika.

References

Further reading 

 

Westland District
Populated places in the West Coast, New Zealand
West Coast Gold Rush
Mining communities in New Zealand